The 1956 All-Southwest Conference football team consists of American football players chosen by various organizations for All-Southwest Conference teams for the 1956 NCAA University Division football season.  The selectors for the 1956 season included the United Press (UP).

All Southwest selections

Backs
 Roddy Osborne, Texas A&M (UP-1 [QB])
 Jim Swink, TCU (UP-1 [HB])
 John David Crow, Texas A&M (UP-1 [HB]) (1957 Heisman Trophy winner; College Football Hall of Fame)
 Jack Pardee, Texas A&M (UP-1 [FB])

Ends
 Tommy Gentry, SMU (UP-1)
 O'Day Williams, TCU (UP-1)

Tackles
 Charles Krueger, Texas A&M (UP-1)
 Norman Hamilton, TCU (UP-1)

Guards
 Bill Glass, Baylor (UP-1)
 Dennis Goehring, Texas A&M (UP-1)

Centers
 Lloyd Hale, Texas A&M (UP-1)

Key
UP = United Press

Bold = Consensus first-team selection of both the AP and UP

See also
1956 College Football All-America Team

References

All-Southwest Conference
All-Southwest Conference football teams